Old Gays are a group of four gay social media personalities and LGBT rights activists. The group consists of Robert Reeves (born October 28, 1943), Michael "Mick" Peterson (born 1956), Bill Lyons (born May 18, 1944) and Jessay Martin (born July 31, 1953). At the time of their formation, their age range was from mid-60s to late 70s. They are the subject of an upcoming unscripted docuseries produced by Brian Graden Media. They first began to gain a following in 2018 after a promotional video for Grindr. As of November 2021, they have one billion followers across social media platforms. The group resides in Cathedral City, California.

References

American LGBT rights activists
American TikTokers